Events in 1980 in Japanese television.

Debuts
 Denshi Sentai Denziman, tokusatsu (1980–1981)
 Fisherman Sanpei, anime (1980–1982)
 Kamen Rider Super-1, tokusatsu (1980–1981)
 The Littl' Bits, anime (1980)
 Invincible Robo Trider G7, anime (1980-1981)
 Miracle Girl (1980)
 Muteking, The Dashing Warrior, anime (1980–1981)
 Rescueman, anime (1980–1981)
 Shadow Warriors, drama (1980)
 Space Warrior Baldios (1980–1981)
 X-Bomber, tokusatsu (1980–1981)
 Ultraman 80, tokusatsu (1980–1981)

Ongoing
Music Fair, music (1964–present)
Mito Kōmon, jidaigeki (1969–2011)
Sazae-san, anime (1969–present)
Ōedo Sōsamō, anime (1970–1984)
Ōoka Echizen, jidaigeki (1970–1999)
Star Tanjō!, talent (1971–1983)
FNS Music Festival, music (1974–present)
Ikkyū-san, anime (1975–1982)
Panel Quiz Attack 25, game show (1975–present)
Doraemon, anime (1979–2005)

Endings
 Battle Fever J, tokusatsu (1979–1980)
 Kamen Rider (Skyrider), tokusatsu (1979–1980)
 Shadow Warriors, drama (1980)
 Supergirl, crime drama (1979–1980)
 The Ultraman, anime (1979–1980)
 Zenderman, anime (1979–1980)

See also
1980 in anime
1980 in Japan
List of Japanese films of 1980

References